Renaudarctidae are a family of tardigrades. It was first described in 1984 by Reinhardt Kristensen and Robert P. Higgins, and named after biologist Jeanne Renaud-Mornant.

Genera
The genus includes the following species:
 Nodarctus Fujimoto & Yamasaki, 2017
 Renaudarctus Kristensen & Higgins, 1984

References

Further reading
Kristensen & Higgins, 1984 : A new family of Arthrotardigrada (Tardigrada: Heterotardigrada) from the Atlantic coast of Florida, U.S.A. Transactions of the American Microscopical Society, vol. 103, no. 3, p. 295-311.
 Nomenclator Zoologicus info

Arthrotardigrada
Tardigrade families